Máire Devine (born 22 October 1972) is an Irish Sinn Féin politician who has served as a Dublin City Councillor since October 2020. She previously served as a Senator for the Labour Panel from April 2016 to March 2020.

Early life
Devine was born in The Liberties to a republican family and involved in campaigns around the 1981 Irish hunger strike. She worked as a psychiatric nurse in England and was a long-term trade union activist.

Personal life
Devine is married to Kevin Devine; they have three children.

Career
Devine was co-opted onto South Dublin County Council in 2011, representing Tallaght Central. She was re-elected in 2014.

She stood unsuccessfully in Dublin South-Central at the 2016 general election, but was later elected to the 25th Seanad on the Labour Panel.

in 2018, she was suspended from Sinn Féin for three months after retweeting a parody Twitter account that referred to Irish Prison Service officer Brian Stack (fatally shot by the IRA in 1983) as a "sadist." She lost her seat at the 2020 Seanad election.

In October 2020 she was co-opted to Dublin City Council representing the South West Inner City to replace Críona Ní Dhálaigh who resigned from her seat the previous month.

References

External links
Máire Devine's page on the Sinn Féin website

1972 births
Living people
Sinn Féin senators
Members of the 25th Seanad
21st-century women members of Seanad Éireann
Politicians from Dublin (city)
Local councillors in South Dublin (county)
Local councillors in Dublin (city)